Graham Cantwell (born 25 March 1974) is an Irish film and television director. He is best known for directing feature film Anton which achieved a three-week domestic cinema release and was nominated for three Irish Film and Television Awards in 2009. His short film A Dublin Story was shortlisted for Academy Award Nomination in 2004 having picked up several film festival awards. In 2010 he directed a new television drama The Guards for TV3 in Ireland. Most recently he directed a romantic comedy set in the film industry in London, The Callback Queen, which premiered at The Galway Film Fleadh in July 2013 and screened in the U.S. at The Jean Cocteau Cinema, owned and run by George R. R. Martin.

In addition to his directing works he is co-founder of Film Venture London and The Attic Studio in Dublin. In 2006 he developed and staged the European premiere of Babylon Heights by Irvine Welsh (of Trainspotting fame) and Dean Cavanagh.

He is represented by Felix de Wolfe in London.

Selected filmography

References

External links
 
 Film Venture London
 The Attic Studio 

Living people
1974 births
Irish film directors
Irish expatriates in the United Kingdom
English-language film directors
Alumni of University College Dublin
Film people from Dublin (city)